America's Court with Judge Ross is an American syndicated court show produced by Entertainment Studios (ES). The program features former Los Angeles County Superior Court Judge Kevin A. Ross presiding over nontraditional/dramatized small claims court cases. Retired Los Angeles County Sheriff's Department captain Bruce Thomas serves as the show's bailiff. Nominated for a Daytime Emmy Award in 2012 for Outstanding Legal/Courtroom Program, the series currently films in Culver City, California.

Production
On October 14, 2009, it was announced that America's Court would launch in syndication. It subsequently debuted September 20, 2010. Aside from Access Hollywood Live, it is the only daytime program currently airing from the 2010-11 season of freshman shows. On February 26, 2014, America's Court was renewed through the 2015–16 broadcast season. On September 14, 2020, the series was renewed for seven seasons through 2027. Season 13 officially began September 12, 2022.

Justice Central
As with the other five ES court programs modeling its format, America's Court with Judge Ross can also be seen on the company's related Justice Central legal network.

References

External links
 
 

2010s American legal television series
2010 American television series debuts
Court shows
English-language television shows
First-run syndicated television programs in the United States
Television series by Entertainment Studios